Nguyễn Trọng Hùng (born 3 October 1997) is a Vietnamese footballer who plays as a midfielder for V.League 1 club Thanh Hóa.

International career

International goals

Vietnam U-22

Honours

Club
Đông Á Thanh Hóa
Vietnamese National Cup:
 Third place : 2022

Vietnam U23
Southeast Asian Games: 2019

References

1997 births
Living people
Vietnamese footballers
Association football midfielders
V.League 1 players
Competitors at the 2019 Southeast Asian Games
Southeast Asian Games medalists in football
Southeast Asian Games gold medalists for Vietnam
Thanh Hóa FC players